Amerila phaedra is a moth of the  subfamily Arctiinae. It was described by Weymer in 1892. It is found in Kenya, Mozambique, Tanzania and Zimbabwe.

References

 , 1997: A revision of the Afrotropical taxa of the genus Amerila Walker (Lepidoptera, Arctiidae). Systematic Entomology 22 (1): 1-44.
 , 1980: Some Afrotropical moths placed in the genera Diacrisia and Rhodogastria (Lepidoptera: Arctiidae: Arctiinae). – Amsterdam: Biologisch Laboratorium der Vrije Universiteit, 1980: 1-190.
 , 1911 Neue Gattungen und Arten afrikanischer Heterocera (Lep.). Deutsche Entomologische Zeitschrift 1911: 584-591.
 , 1892: Exotische Lepidopteren VI. (Aus dem afrikanischen Faunengebiet.). Entomologische Zeitung herausgegeben von dem entomologischen Vereine zu Stettin 53 (4-6): 79-125.

Moths described in 1892
Amerilini
Insects of Tanzania
Moths of Africa